Tom Norman Cornsweet (April 29, 1929 – November 11, 2017) was an American experimental psychologist known for his pioneering work in visual perception, especially the effect that bears his name, and in the development of ophthalmic instrumentation.

Academic background and scientific research 

Cornsweet is known for documenting the effect that bears his name in the 1960s. Prior to his work on this particular optical illusion, Cornsweet graduated from Cornell University and enrolled in a graduate program at Brown University, operating in the vision research laboratory of Lorrin A. Riggs. During his graduate studies he was co-author of an early paper describing stabilized images. His 1955 Ph.D. dissertation in experimental psychology involved small movements of the eye. Cornsweet was an assistant professor at Yale University from 1955–1959, and then became professor of psychology at the University of California, Berkeley. His interest in psychophysics led him to develop a widely employed improvement in the staircase method. As an outgrowth of the courses he taught, Cornsweet published a frequently-cited textbook.

Inventor and entrepreneur 
In the late 1960s and early 1970s, Cornsweet was a key member of the Bioinformation Systems Group at the Stanford Research Institute (SRI). While also teaching in the psychology department at Stanford University, he designed or co-designed several innovative instruments for measuring properties of the eye, including eyetrackers, auto-refractors, and optical fundus scanners. He left SRI to become Chief Scientist at Acuity Systems of Reston Virginia, where he developed the first commercial auto-refractor in 1973. It gave the objective reading of the  refractive index of the eye in one second, saving practitioners up to 15 minutes a patient. This saved the Ophthalmologist more than an hour a day on average, immediately adding a huge productivity and income boost. Acuity Systems introduced the worlds first Auto-refractor and sold approximately 3000 world wide between 1975 and 1979 before it was bought by Simmons Instruments Inc. Many copies followed made by Coherent Radiation of California, Nidek of Japan and others. All versions of the Auto-refractor sold are estimated to total $15bn as the instrument is now universally commonplace in the Optometrist and Ophthalmologist workplaces. The Auto-refractor saved sight in many cases. One of many such instances occurred in Sydney Australia when a severely myopic patient, blind because the closest his expert optometrist could come to prescribing spectacles was 5.75 diopter sphere, 3.75 diopter cylinder at an incorrect angle, and the Auto-refractor immediately six times indicated a prescription of 15.75D sphere x 5.75D cylinder at 108 degrees. The patient was seen leaving the practise and heard proclaiming “I can see, I can see!”
Multiple thousands of such instances occurred worldwide. 
A device to measure the refractive index of spectacle lenses, the Auto-lensmeter was also a commercial success in parallel with the Auto-refractor.
In the 1980’s Tom Cornsweet developed a number of devices including one which measured the density of cataracts, ESA, the Eye System Analyser, which in a 30 second eye test determined presence of diseases of the nervous or muscular system such as MS 15 years before its noticeable onset, Hopkinson disease two years before onset and many other diseases.
An industrial version, FIT 2000, first installations worldwide implemented in the coal mines of Queensland Australia, and later in mines of Chile, resulted in huge safety gains in the workplace, detecting immediately up to 5% of the workforce were participating in sleep deprivation activity, drug taking, prescription medication overuse and alcohol abuse. After a 36 second daily eye test and a ten day baseline was established, it was very easy to determine the presence of drugs, which drugs, alcohol, lack of sleep, and, after medical referral, diseases such as Narcolepsy, Brain diseases and damage. The FIT2000, sold and manufactured by PMI of Rockville, Maryland has also been installed worldwide into Armed forces for such things as fatigue detection in pilots and soldiers required to undertake military activities with severe sleep deprivation over many days. 
Cornsweet continued to invent devices for measuring various properties of the eye and also to teach, first at the Baylor College of Medicine and later at the University of California, Irvine. He served as Vice President of research and development for Sensory Technologies from 1994 to 1997. In 1999 Cornsweet retired from UC–Irvine and co-founded Visual Pathways, where his team developed an automated retinal imaging system intended for the diagnoses of glaucoma, cataracts, diabetic retinopathy and macular degeneration. Visual Pathways folded into the Brien Holden Vision Institute after several years and successfully installing 24 breakthrough 3D fundus cameras, where from 2013 to 2015, Tom Cornsweet was Chief Scientist at Brien Holden Vision Diagnostics (formerly Quantum Catch), a company developing very low-cost ophthalmic 3D fundus cameras and instruments for detection and monitoring of eye, brain and muscle disease primarily and principally for 3rd world countries which could not afford available instrumentation.
Until his death in 2017, Cornsweet was Professor of Cognitive Science, Electrical and Computer Engineering, and Ophthalmology, Emeritus, University of California, Irvine.

Patents and awards 
 40 patents, primarily in the area of optical and ophthalmic instrumentation
 UC Berkeley Distinguished Teaching award 1961
 Charles F. Prentice Medal Award  from the American Academy of Optometry, 1984

Publications
Cornsweet wrote three books and published more than 100 journal articles.
 Books
 
 
 Why is Everything!: Doing Science
Seeing.How light tells us about the world.Tom Cornsweet.2017.Publisher University of California presS.

 Journal articles

 
 
 
 T.N. Cornsweet. PhD Thesis Publication No. 13, 163. University Microfilms, Library of Congress #MICA 55-1914.
 
 
 
 
 
 
 
 T.N. Cornsweet. "Measuring movements of the retinal image with respect to the retina". In: Biomedical Sciences Instrumentation, Volume 2, Plenum Press. (1964)
 
 
 T.N. Cornsweet. Stabilized image techniques. National Academy of Sciences Symposium, "Recent developments in vision research." (1966)
 
 
 
 
 T.N. Cornsweet. The Purkinje-image method of recording eye position. In: Eye movements and psychological processes, Monty and Senders, eds., Lawrence Earlbaum Associates, Inc. (1976)
 T.N. Cornsweet. The Bezold-Brucke effect and its complement, hue constancy. In: Visual Psychophysics: The physiological foundations. Academic Press. (1978)
 T.N. Cornsweet, S. Hersh, R. Beesmer, and D. Cornsweet. Quantification of the shape and color of the optic nerve head. In: Advances in diagnostic visual optics. Breinin and Siegal, eds, Springer-Verlag. (1983)
 
 
 J.I. Yellott, B.A. Wandell, and T. N. Cornsweet. The beginnings of visual perception. In: Handbook of Physiology, Vol. III, The nervous system. Darian Smith, ed. The American Physiological Society. (1984)
 
 
 T.N. Cornsweet. Understanding the swinging flashlight test. In: Non-invasive assessment of the visual system, Volume 1, Optical Society of America Technical Digest series. (1993)

List of publications adapted from Cornsweet's curriculum vitae, published by the University of California, Berkeley.

References

External links 

 Website of Brien Holden Vision
 Website of Quantum Catch, co-founded by Cornsweet

1929 births
2017 deaths
American inventors
20th-century American psychologists
Baylor College of Medicine faculty
Brown University alumni
Cornell University alumni
Writers from Cleveland
SRI International people
Stanford University faculty
University of California, Berkeley College of Letters and Science faculty
University of California, Irvine faculty
Yale University faculty
American male writers